James Roger Green (born 14 June 1982) is a British professional racing driver. He is currently employed by Audi Sport Team Rosberg in the Deutsche Tourenwagen Masters (DTM) touring car championship.

Early career
Green was born in Leicester. At the age of 10, he entered BriSCA Ministox and won the British Championship in his first season. He then progressed to karting, finishing runner-up in the Junior TKM series in 1996.

In 1997, he moved up to the Junior ICA Winter Series, in which he won the title, and finished runner-up in the McLaren Mercedes Champions of the Future series. He won the Formula A Winter Series in 2000, then finished runner-up in British Formula A in 2001. He dovetailed the British campaign with the European Formula A championship during 2000 and 2001, in which he achieved two race wins.

Formula Renault
Green's first season in single seater formula cars was spent in the British Formula Renault Winter Series in 2001, in which he achieved a best race finish of 2nd place. The 2002 season was spent in the British Formula Renault championship with Fortec Racing, finishing the year as championship runner-up with two race wins. He also made a one-off appearance in the Formula Renault Eurocup with Fortec's European operation. His Formula Renault career culminated with a win in the Asian Formula Renault Challenge at Macau in November 2002.

Formula 3
In 2003, Green progressed to the British Formula 3 championship with Carlin Motorsport. He again finished in the runner-up position in his first season and won four races. During that year, he made his debut in the Formula Three Euroseries, competing in three rounds (six races) for Team Kolles and one round (two races) for ASM Formule 3.

2004 saw Green enter his first full season in the Euroseries with ASM, having gained backing from Mercedes-Benz. He achieved seven race wins, six poles, and 139 points en route to the championship title.

DTM

For the 2005 season, Mercedes placed Green in the DTM. He drove one of its customer cars – a 2004 C-class – run by Persson Motorsport, with which he achieved a 6th-place finish on his debut, secured two pole positions and finished 6th overall in the championship standings, with a total of 29 points.

2006 saw him promoted – along with his teammate from Persson, Bruno Spengler – to the factory Mercedes-AMG line-up, run by H.W.A. GmbH, alongside multiple champion Bernd Schneider and former Formula One driver Mika Häkkinen. He achieved four pole positions and a best finish of 2nd place on two occasions, but no wins. He was classified 5th overall, with a total of 31 points. In 2007, he continued to be part of the factory line-up and reached the top step of the podium for the first time with two race wins in the last two rounds of the season. After the 2008 season, despite two victories he was moved into a one-year-old car to make way for former champion Gary Paffett, but was still able to win round four at the Norisring.

Racing record

Complete Formula 3 Euro Series results
(key) (Races in bold indicate pole position) (Races in italics indicate fastest lap)

Complete Deutsche Tourenwagen Masters results
(key) (Races in bold indicate pole position) (Races in italics indicate fastest lap)

† Driver did not finish, but was classified as he completed 75% of the race distance.

Complete Blancpain GT World Challenge Europe results

Other achievements
In 2002, Green won the McLaren Autosport BRDC Young Driver of the Year award, beating five other nominated finalists in a series of on-track trials in touring cars and formula single-seaters.

Jamie's brother Nigel is a leading exponent in BriSCA Formula 2 and Formula 1 Stock Car racing. Nigel won the 2017 BriSCA F1 World Championship.

Championship titles
2004 Formula 3 Euroseries
2000 Formula A British Super Libre Winter Series
1997 Junior ICA British Winter Series
1992 Brisca Ministox British Championship

References

External links

 Jamie Green official website
 Forix.autosport.com
 F1 Prospects
 Formel 3 Guide 
 Speedsport Magazine

British Formula Three Championship drivers
Karting World Championship drivers
Deutsche Tourenwagen Masters drivers
English racing drivers
Formula Renault Eurocup drivers
Formula 3 Euro Series drivers
Formula 3 Euro Series champions
Sportspeople from Leicester
1982 births
Living people
Carlin racing drivers
ART Grand Prix drivers
HWA Team drivers
Team Rosberg drivers
Audi Sport drivers
Mercedes-AMG Motorsport drivers
W Racing Team drivers
Phoenix Racing drivers
Kolles Racing drivers
Team Meritus drivers
Asian Formula Renault Challenge drivers
ISR Racing drivers
Mücke Motorsport drivers
ADAC GT Masters drivers
Fortec Motorsport drivers
Saintéloc Racing drivers